Wedemeyer may refer to:

 Albert Coady Wedemeyer, U.S. general in World War II
 Charles Wedemeyer, American pioneer of Distance and Independent Learning
 Christian K. Wedemeyer, American professor and Illinois politician
 William Wedemeyer, U.S. politician